The 1929 Chicago Cardinals season was their tenth in the league. The team improved on their previous output of 1–5, winning six games  and finishing fourth in the league. 

The Cardinals-Steam Roller game was the first night game in NFL history, which the Cardinals won 16–0, on two touchdowns, an extra point and a field goal by Ernie Nevers. Nevers also scored 40 points, the most in a game by a player in NFL history, in a 40–6 victory against the Bears. 

Nevers' six rushing touchdowns in that game is an NFL record as of 2021, which was tied by New Orleans Saints running back Alvin Kamara in a 2020 Christmas Day game.

Schedule

Standings

References

Arizona Cardinals seasons
Chicago Cardinals
Chicago